William Holt may refer to:

Politicians
 William Holt (fl.1397), MP for Launceston
 William Holt (died 1436), MP for Warwickshire
 William Holt (mayor) (1737–1791), mayor of Williamsburg, Virginia
 William Holte or Holt, MP for Clitheroe and Preston

Others
 William Holt (Jesuit) (1545–1599), rector of English College
 William Holt (writer) (1897–1977), English writer, artist and traveller
 Lt. William Holt, the main character in Medal of Honor: European Assault
 William Holt (cricketer) (born 1935), former New Zealand cricketer
 William H. Holt (1842–1919), American judge
 Will Holt (1929–2015), writer and lyricist
 Willy Holt (1921–2007), American production designer
 William Mack Holt (1917–1942), American Navy sailor and naval aviator